Lisbet Lundquist (born 25 March 1943) is a Danish film actress. She appeared in more than thirty films since 1971.

Selected filmography

References

External links
 	
	
	

1943 births
Living people
Danish film actresses
Danish television actresses
People from Gentofte Municipality